This is a list of African-American pioneers in desegregation of higher education.

19th century

1840s

1847 
First African American to graduate from a U.S. medical school: Dr. David J. Peck (Rush Medical College)

1849 
First African-American college professor at a predominantly white institution: Charles L. Reason, New York Central College

1860s

1862 
First African-American woman to earn a B.A.: Mary Jane Patterson, Oberlin College

1864 
 First African-American woman in the United States to earn an M.D.: Rebecca Davis Lee Crumpler

1870s

1872 
First African American midshipman admitted to the United States Naval Academy: John H. Conyers (nominated by Robert B. Elliott of South Carolina)

1873 
First African American educator to lead the Arkansas Industrial University Board of Trustees: Joseph Carter Corbin

1876 
First African American to earn a doctorate degree from an American university: Edward Alexander Bouchet (Yale College Ph.D., physics; also first African American to graduate from Yale, 1874)

1879 
First African American to graduate from a formal nursing school: Mary Eliza Mahoney, Boston, Massachusetts

1880s

1883 
First known African-American woman to graduate from one of the Seven Sisters colleges: Hortense Parker (Mount Holyoke College)

1890s

1890
 First African-American woman to earn a dental degree in the United States: Ida Rollins, who earned it from the University of Michigan.

1895 
First African American to earn a doctorate degree (Ph.D.) from Harvard University: W.E.B. Du Bois

20th century

1910s

1917 
 First African-American to enter the University of Oregon: Mabel Byrd

1920s

1921 
Three African American women earn PhDs within nine days of each other: Georgiana R. Simpson, PhD in German Philology, University of Chicago, June 14, 1921; Sadie Tanner Mossell, PhD in Economics, University of Pennsylvania, June 15, 1921; Eva B. Dykes, PhD in English Language, Radcliffe College, June 22, 1921. Georgiana Rose Simpson was thus the first African-American woman to receive a PhD in the United States.

1923 
 First African-American woman to earn a degree in library science: Virginia Proctor Powell Florence. She earned the degree (Bachelor of Library Science) from what is now part of the University of Pittsburgh.

1930s

1931 
First African-American woman to graduate from Yale Law School: Jane Matilda Bolin

1932 
First African-American Ph.D in anthropology: William Montague Cobb

1940s

1940 
 First African-American to earn a doctorate in library science: (Eliza Atkins Gleason, who earned it from the University of Chicago)

1943 
 First African-American woman to earn a Ph.D. in mathematics: Euphemia Haynes, from Catholic University of America

1947 
First African-American full-time faculty member at a predominantly white law school: William Robert Ming (University of Chicago Law School)

1948 
 First African-American to be admitted to a traditionally white Southern university since Reconstruction: Silas Herbert Hunt, University of Arkansas.
 First African-American male to graduate from Oregon State College: William Tebeau

1949 
 First African American graduate of the U.S. Naval Academy: Wesley Brown

1950s

1952 
 First African-American to graduate from the University of Arkansas for Medical Sciences: Edith Irby Jones

1956 
 First African-American to attend the University of Alabama: Autherine Lucy. Her expulsion from the institution later that year led to the university's President Oliver Carmichael's resignation.

1960s

1960 
 First African-American to attend the William Frantz Elementary School in Louisiana, which occurred during the New Orleans school desegregation crisis on 14 November 1960: Ruby Bridges

1961 
 First African-American to attend (and in 1965, the first to graduate) dental school at the University of Missouri–Kansas City School of Dentistry: Donald Randolph Brown, Sr.

1962
 Dr. Tom Jones, D.D.S., an African-American student who had won a scholarship from Phillips Petroleum Company, entered University of Missouri–Kansas City School of Dentistry. He became the second African American to attend, and graduate, dental school, graduating in 1965. Some of the school's patients would refuse to let the two African-American students treat them. Speaking in 2007, Jones said, "Dean Hamilton Robinson and Assistant Dean Jack Wells refused to negotiate. "They would say, 'Either they work on you or nobody works on you.'"

1963 
First African American to graduate from the U.S. Air Force Academy: Charles V. Bush
First African American to graduate from the University of Mississippi: James Meredith
Wendell Wilkie Gunn is a retired corporate executive, a former Reagan Administration official, and the first African American student to enroll and graduate from the University of North Alabama in 1965 (then Florence State College) in Florence, Alabama.

1969 
First African-American graduate of Harvard Business School: Lillian Lincoln

1970s

1978 
 First person in the state of Arkansas to become board certified in pediatric endocrinology (Dr. Joycelyn Elders).

1980s

1980 
First African-American woman to graduate from (and to attend) the U.S. Naval Academy: Janie L. Mines, graduated in 1980

References

Notes 

Higher education in the United States

Lists of African-American people
History of racial segregation in the United States
History of African-American civil rights
African Americans and education